The Fedchenko Glacier is a large glacier in the Yazgulem Range, Pamir Mountains, of north-central Gorno-Badakhshan province, Tajikistan. It is the longest glacier in the world outside of the polar regions.

Path and location
The glacier follows a generally northward path to the east of the  Garmo Peak. Its waters eventually feed down the Muksu, Surkhob, Vakhsh, and Amu Darya rivers into the Aral Sea.

To the west is the Academy of Sciences Range, Mount Garmo, Ismoil Somoni Peak, Peak Korzhenevskaya and the headwaters of the Vanj River and Yazgulyam River. To the south is Independence Peak and to the east Gorbunov Peak (6,025 meters). To the north is Altyn Mazar.

Discovery
The glacier was discovered in 1878, and is named after Alexei Pavlovich Fedchenko, a Russian explorer (but not discoverer of the glacier). The Fedchenko was not fully explored until 1928 by a German-Soviet expedition under Willi Rickmer Rickmers. It continued to recede between 1928 and 1960, stopping its inflows such as the Kosinenko, Ulugbeck, Alert and several others.

See also
 List of glaciers

Notes

References
"Fedchenko Glacier".  Encyclopædia Britannica online edition.  Retrieved 8 December 2005.
"The First National Communication of the Republic of Tajikistan under the United Nations Framework Convention on Climate Change.  Repeblic of Tajikistan Ministry for Nature Protection.  Dushanbe: 2002.
"Tajikistan 2002: Vital Maps and Graphics on Climate Change" . Tajikistan Met Service.  Retrieved 18 August 2005.
"Tajikistan - Topography and Drainage". U.S. Department of the Army.  Published by the Federal Research Division of the Library of Congress.  Online version retrieved 8 December 2005.

External links
Map of glaciation in the Pamir Mountains 
Google Maps satellite photo of Fedchenco Glacier (solid white line running approximately vertically in center of image)
Current weather and 5-day forecast, from CNN

Glaciers of Tajikistan
Pamir Mountains